Frédéric Gabriel (born 20 July 1970 in Blesmes) is a French former road cyclist. He was professional from 1995 to 2007, and most notably won the Tour Nord-Isère in 1994 and the Tour de la Somme in 2003.

Major results

1994
 1st Overall Tour Nord-Isère
 3rd Paris–Chauny
1997
 3rd Overall Circuit des Mines
1st Stage 1
 10th Overall Route du Sud
1998
 2nd Overall Tour de Serbie
 3rd Overall Tour de l'Oise
 4th Overall Tour de l'Ain
1st Stage 1
 4th Polymultipliée de l'Hautil
2000
 1st Stage 3 Tour de l'Ain
2001
 8th Giro della Provincia di Siracusa
2002
 5th Tour du Doubs
2003
 1st Overall Tour de la Somme
 6th Grand Prix d'Isbergues
 8th Boucles de l'Aulne
 8th Tour du Finistère
2004
 4th Tour du Doubs
 7th Polynormande
 9th Overall Paris–Corrèze
 9th GP de Villers Cotterêts
2006
 10th Tour du Finistère
2007
 2nd Overall Tour de Wallonie

References

External links

1970 births
Living people
French male cyclists